The 1931 New York Yankees season was the team's 29th season. The team finished with a record of 94–59, finishing 13.5 games behind the Philadelphia Athletics. New York was managed by Joe McCarthy. The Yankees played their home games at Yankee Stadium.  This team is notable for holding the modern day Major League record for team runs scored in a season with 1,067 (6.88 runs per game average).

Offseason 
 December 10, 1930: Cy Perkins was purchased by the Yankees from the Philadelphia Athletics.
 January 13, 1931: Harry Rice was selected off waivers from the Yankees by the Washington Senators.

Regular season 
First baseman Lou Gehrig set an American League record by driving in 184 runs, breaking his own record of 175 set in 1927. The total, which was seven short of Hack Wilson's all-time record of 191 set the previous year, still stands as of the end of the 2022 season.

Season standings

Record vs. opponents

Roster

Player stats

Batting

Starters by position 
Note: Pos = Position; G = Games played; AB = At bats; H = Hits; Avg. = Batting average; HR = Home runs; RBI = Runs batted in

Other batters 
Note: G = Games played; AB = At bats; H = Hits; Avg. = Batting average; HR = Home runs; RBI = Runs batted in

Pitching

Starting pitchers 
Note: G = Games pitched; IP = Innings pitched; W = Wins; L = Losses; ERA = Earned run average; SO = Strikeouts

Other pitchers 
Note: G = Games pitched; IP = Innings pitched; W = Wins; L = Losses; ERA = Earned run average; SO = Strikeouts

Relief pitchers 
Note: G = Games pitched; W = Wins; L = Losses; SV = Saves; ERA = Earned run average; SO = Strikeouts

Awards and honors

League records 
 Lou Gehrig, American League single season record, runs batted in for a season (184)

Farm system 

LEAGUE CHAMPIONS: Cumberland

Notes

References 
1931 New York Yankees at Baseball Reference
1931 New York Yankees team page at www.baseball-almanac.com

New York Yankees seasons
New York Yankees
New York Yankees
1930s in the Bronx